The 2012 CONSUR Women's Sevens was the eighth edition of the tournament and was held in Estádio da Gávea, Rio de Janeiro, Brazil from 10 to 11 March. Brazil defeated Colombia 34–5 to win the Championship.

Teams

Pool stages

Pool A

Pool B

Finals

Cup Final

5th–8th Place Playoff

Final standings

References 

2012 in women's rugby union
2012 rugby sevens competitions
Rugby sevens competitions in Brazil
Rugby sevens competitions in South America